Strelecky or Streletsky is an adjective formed from strelets (a shooter) in several Slavic languages; it may refer to 
John Strelecky (born 1969), American author
Střelecký Island in Prague, Czech Republic
Stadion Střelecký ostrov, a football stadium in České Budějovice, Czech Republic

See also
Strzelecki (disambiguation), a Polish variant